Bootsy? Player of the Year is the third album by the American funk band Bootsy's Rubber Band.

Reception

The album was released on Warner Bros. Records on January 20, 1978. At the height of the album's popularity, it competed head to head with Bootsy Collins' mentor George Clinton and his band Parliament, who had released the album Funkentelechy Vs. the Placebo Syndrome just two months earlier.

Bootsy? Player of the Year featured two hit singles, "Bootzilla", which went to number one on the Billboard Hot Soul Singles charts, and "Hollywood Squares". The album peaked at number one on the Billboard Soul Album charts for four non-consecutive weeks. The original vinyl version of the album contained a pair of cut out star shaped eyeglasses. It probably stands as the band's most successful album to date. The album introduces Collins' roles as Bootzilla and The Player.

The album was produced by George Clinton and Bootsy Collins and arranged by "THE PLAYER". The album was reissued in 1990 by Warner/Pioneer of Japan (now Warner Music-Japan), then through WEA International in the mid-1990s and then by Time/Warner in the U.S. in April 1998.

Track listing
Radio Active / A / Side 1
"Bootsy? (What's the Name Of This Town)" (Bootsy Collins, George Clinton, Maceo Parker) - (6:59)
"May The Force Be With You" (Bootsy Collins, George Clinton, Gary Cooper) - (6:02)
"Very Yes" (Bootsy Collins, George Clinton, Gary Cooper) - (8:24)
Monster Rock / A+ / Side 2
"Bootzilla"  (Bootsy Collins, George Clinton) - (5:38) (released as a single-Warners WB 8512)
"Hollywood Squares" (Bootsy Collins, George Clinton, Frank Waddy) - (6:15)(released as a single-Warner WBS 8575)
"Roto-Rooter" (Bootsy Collins, George Clinton, Phelps Collins) - (6:25)
"As In (I Love You)" (Bootsy Collins, George Clinton, Bernie Worrell) - (5:08)

Personnel
Phelps Collins, Bootsy Collins - guitar
Frank Waddy, Bootsy Collins, Gary Cooper, Jerome Brailey on "Very Yes" - drums
Bootsy Collins - bass
Joel Johnson - keyboards
Fred Wesley, Maceo Parker, Richard Griffith, Rick Gardner - horns
Gary Cooper, Robert Johnson - vocals

Charts

Singles

See also
List of number-one R&B albums of 1978 (U.S.)

References

External links
 Album at Discogs

1978 albums
Bootsy Collins albums
Warner Records albums